Greensburg Township is an inactive township in Knox County, in the U.S. state of Missouri.

Greensburg Township was established in 1859, taking its name from Greensburg, Missouri.

References

Townships in Missouri
Townships in Knox County, Missouri